is a former Japanese football player. He plays for Kataller Toyama.

Career
Ryo Takiya joined J2 League club FC Gifu in 2016. After joining ReinMeer Aomori on loan, he opted to retire at 25 years old.

Club statistics
Updated to 5 April 2020.

References

External links

Profile at FC Gifu
Profile at Kataller Toyama

1994 births
Living people
Osaka Gakuin University alumni
People from Zama, Kanagawa
Association football people from Kanagawa Prefecture
Japanese footballers
J2 League players
J3 League players
Japan Football League players
FC Gifu players
Kataller Toyama players
ReinMeer Aomori players
Association football forwards